2-Chloro-6-fluorotoluene (CFT) is a halogenated derivative of toluene that is used as an intermediate in numerous organic syntheses.

Uses 
CFT is used to prepare 2-chloro-6-fluorobenzaldehyde via oxidation with hydrogen peroxide, which forms an aldehyde group.

CFT is also used in the preparation of 4-chloro-1H-indazole.

References

Fluoroarenes
Chloroarenes
Benzene derivatives